The Trumpets are Blowing (German: Es blasen die Trompeten) is a 1926 German silent film directed by Carl Boese and starring Bruno Kastner, Hugo Fischer-Köppe, and Eddie Seefeld.

Cast
Bruno Kastner 
Hugo Fischer-Köppe 
Eddie Seefeld 
Hans Albers 
Erich Kaiser-Titz 
Anita Dorris 
Fritz Spira 
Karl Elzer 
Ruth Weyher

References

Bibliography
Hans-Michael Bock and Tim Bergfelder. The Concise Cinegraph: An Encyclopedia of German Cinema. Berghahn Books, 2009.

External links

1926 films
Films of the Weimar Republic
German silent feature films
Films directed by Carl Boese
Terra Film films
German black-and-white films